Untold Legends: Dark Kingdom is an action role-playing video game developed and published by Sony Online Entertainment in 2006 as a launch title for the PlayStation 3. It is the third game in the Untold Legends series. Although set within the same universe, Dark Kingdom is unrelated in story to the first two games in the series.

Gameplay

Untold Legends: Dark Kingdom is a third-person Dungeon Crawling Action RPG. Similar to other games in this style, the player will choose a class and go through dungeons killing enemies, gaining experience and leveling up. Dark Kingdom is also more linear than its predecessors, without hub towns that the player can come back after finishing a dungeon/mission. Also, there are no NPC characters that the player can talk to repeatedly and also no Merchant to buy items. Health, essence and Mana can only be replenished from orbs in a variety of colors that drops from enemies.

There are three playable characters:

Golan Kor: The warrior of the group. He is the strongest of the three characters, using a giant hammer/ax to fight. As the warrior, he has high physical strength but low magic power.
Malakesh: The mage of the group. He is the smartest and most magically adept of the group. He uses a staff to fight. As the mage, he has low physical strength but high magic power.
Zala: The scout of the group and the fastest of the three characters, she appears on the front cover of the game. She uses twin blades to fight. As the scout, she has medium physical strength and medium magic power.

Plot

After serving the King loyally for years in foreign conflicts, an elite unit of knights returns home to find it a changed place. The knights are appalled by the discovery that dark magic has corrupted their kingdom and that the King now plans to use them against their own people. Therefore, they devise a plan to assassinate the malevolent ruler. When the attempt on the King's life is foiled, the would-be assassins barely escape. They end up on the run from an army they once served.

Development and release

The game was retailed 2 days ahead of the PlayStation 3 release in North America.

Reception
 

The game received "mixed or average" reviews according to video game review aggregator Metacritic.

References

External links
 
 Official website

2006 video games
Action role-playing video games
Fantasy video games
Multiplayer and single-player video games
PlayStation 3-only games
PlayStation 3 games
Sony Interactive Entertainment games
Video games developed in the United States
Video games featuring female protagonists
Video games scored by Laura Karpman

Video games using Havok